Rare is a global nonprofit environmental organization whose mission is to inspire change so people and nature thrive. Headquartered in the United States, Rare has programs and staff in over 10 countries (including the Philippines, Indonesia, Mozambique, Brazil, the Pacific Islands, the Mesoamerican Reef region, and Germany) working to safeguard biodiversity, ensure livelihoods, gender equity, and food security, and make their communities and countries more climate resilient. Rare has empowered over 10 million individuals, through more than 450 behavior change campaigns, to shift their behaviors and practices to protect the shared planet.  

Rare receives 4 out of 4 stars from Charity Navigator.

History

Rare was founded in 1973 by David Hill. Since its founding, Rare has worked with over 1,500 communities in 60+ countries to address urgent natural resource threats such as overfishing, climate change, deforestation, water pollution, and regenerative agriculture.   

Rare's approach was born In 1977, when a young student named Paul Butler arrived on the island nation of St. Lucia to find the beautiful St. Lucia parrot was in critical danger. Fewer than 100 remained. Paul knew that to save the parrot, he would need to inspire St. Lucians to be part of the solution. Working with the Forestry Department, Paul led a social marketing campaign to inspire pride in the bird. He visited schools and churches, recorded radio spots, produced bumper stickers and billboards, and he even created a parrot mascot named Jacquot. The campaign worked, and stirred a strong emotional connection. The community embraced the parrot as a national treasure, and its population surged. What made this underdog campaign successful?  Pride.

Approach to Conservation

Rare’s mission is to inspire change so people and nature thrive. Rare has led the environmental field in applying behavioral science to community-based conservation—using insights from behavioral and social science and design thinking to encourage individuals and their communities to adopt behaviors that benefit people and nature, and ensure that change lasts. 

Rare specializes in identifying proven locally-led solutions and working with communities, their governments, and partners worldwide to scale these solutions. Rare partners with communities to protect their environment while supporting their needs, and works closely with mayors, local leaders, and other levels of governments on policies that remove barriers and incentivize community-led solutions. Across its history, Rare has partnered with communities, organizations, and governments to balance human use and environmental protection and help communities of people to adopt more sustainable behaviors and practices.

Each of Rare’s programs today – The Center for Behavior & the Environment, Fish Forever, Lands for Life and Climate Culture'' – supports the shared goal of driving collective action at the local level to address global challenges.

The Center for Behavior & the Environment
The Center for Behavior & the Environment (BE.Center) at Rare is the world’s first center dedicated exclusively to behavioral science and design for the environment. It was launched in 2017 to increase the effective use of behavior-centered design principles among environmental practitioners. With a diverse team of world-class behavioral and social scientists, designers, and trainers, the BE.Center connects research and insights from behavioral and social sciences and design thinking to practitioners on the frontlines of our most urgent environmental challenges.

Board and Leadership 
Rare President and CEO: Brett Jenks

Rare Board of Trustees Chair: Dorothy Batten, President of the DN Batten Foundation

References

External links
 Rare's official website
Rare's blog
 Charity Navigator budget summary
 The Washington Post Well-funded program tries new approach to tackle overfishing in developing world
 up! magazine Youtube video St. Lucia & the Jacquot Parrot

Nature conservation organizations based in the United States
Environmental organizations based in Virginia
International environmental organizations